Patrizia Di Napoli (born 27 September 1969) is a former Italian female long-distance runner who competed at two editions of the IAAF World Cross Country Championships at senior level (1996, 1998). She won one national championships at senior level (cross country running: 2006).

References

External links
 

1969 births
Living people
Italian female long-distance runners
Italian female cross country runners